Ladyfingers, or in British English sponge fingers (sometimes known by the Italian name   or by the French name  ), are low-density, dry, egg-based, sweet sponge cake biscuits roughly shaped like large fingers. They are a principal ingredient in many dessert recipes, such as trifles and charlottes, and are also used as fruit or chocolate gateau linings, and for the sponge element of tiramisu. They are typically soaked in a sugar syrup or liqueur, or in coffee or espresso for tiramisu. Plain ladyfingers are commonly given to infants, being soft enough for teething mouths, but easy to grasp and firm enough not to fall apart.

History

Ladyfingers originated in the late 15th century at the court of the Duchy of Savoy, and were created to mark the occasion of a visit by the King of France. Later, they were given the name savoiardi and recognized as an "official" court biscuit. They were particularly appreciated by the younger members of the court and offered to visitors as an example of the local cuisine.

Name
They have gained many regional names:

 In Argentina: 
 In Australia: sponge fingers
 In Austria: 
 In Bosnia, Croatia, and Serbia: /, /
 In Brazil:  (champagne biscuits)
 In Bulgaria: bishkoti
 In Canada: ladyfingers
 In Chile:  (champagne biscuits)
 In China:  (finger biscuits)
 In Colombia:  (tongues, after their form)
 In Cuba: 
 In El Salvador: suspiros
 In Finland: tiramisukeksit (tiramisù biscuits), savoiardikeksit (savoiardi biscuits), and sokerikakkukeksit (sugar cake biscuits)
 In Germany:  (spoon cookies/biscuits)
 In Greece:  (a French adaptation of the Italian name)
 In Guatemala: 
 In Hungary:  (baby sponge cake)
 In Indonesia:  (cat's tongue cookies)
 In Iran: latifeh
 In Israel: 
 In Italy: 
 In North Macedonia: biskviti
 In Mexico:  (little soles)
 In Flanders and the Netherlands:  (long fingers)
 In Pakistan: bistiks ( بسٹیکس)
 In Portugal:  (champagne biscuits) or 
 In Romania: 
 In Russia:  (lady's fingers)
 In Slovakia:  (Konditor's biscuits)
 In Slovenia:  ("baby cookies")
 In South Africa: sold as boudoir biscuits, but best known as finger biscuits
 In Spain:  (little sole biscuits)
 In Taiwan:  (fingers-cookie)
 In Turkey:  (cat's tongue)
 In the United Kingdom: sponge fingers, boudoir biscuits, baby biscuits, funeral biscuits, savoy biscuits, or boudoir fingers
 In the United States: ladyfingers
 In Uruguay and Venezuela:  (insoles)
In Vietnam: bánh sâm banh, bánh săm pa (biscuits champagne)

Preparation

Like other sponge cakes, ladyfingers traditionally contain no chemical leavening agent, and rely on air incorporated into the eggs for their "sponge" texture. Some brands, though, contain ammonium bicarbonate. The egg whites and egg yolks mixed with sugar are typically beaten separately and folded together with flour. They contain more flour than the typical sponge cake. The mixture is piped through a pastry bag in short lines onto sheets, giving the biscuits their notable shape.

Before baking, powdered sugar is usually sifted over the top to give a soft crust. The finished ladyfingers are usually layered into a dessert such as tiramisu or trifle.

References

External links

Biscuits
Cakes
Italian pastries